Podocalyxin-like protein 1 is a protein that in humans is encoded by the PODXL gene.

Function 

This gene encodes a member of the CD34 sialomucin protein family. The encoded protein was originally identified as an important component of glomerular podocytes. Inactivation of the encoding gene in mice leads to anuria, omphalocele and perinatal death. Podocytes are highly differentiated epithelial cells with interdigitating foot processes covering the outer aspect of the glomerular basement membrane. Other biological activities of the encoded protein include: binding in a membrane protein complex with Na+/H+ exchanger regulatory factor to intracellular cytoskeletal elements, playing a role in hematopoietic cell differentiation, and being expressed in vascular endothelium cells and binding to L-selectin.

Expression 

The expression and localisation of PODXL in human cells, tissues and organs have been investigated by the Human Protein Atlas consortium. According to antibody-based profiling, the protein is present in glomerular podocytes, endothelial cells, glandular cells in fallopian tube, uterus and seminal vesicle and according to RNA expression analysis, the PODXL transcripts are present in all analysed human tissues. Based on confocal microscopy, the protein is mainly localised to the plasma membrane and microtubule organizing center and in addition localized to vesicles.

Interactions 

PODXL has been shown to interact with Sodium-hydrogen exchange regulatory cofactor 2.

Clinical significance 

Podocalyxin is upregulated in a number of cancers and is frequently associated with poor prognosis.  Based on patient survival data, high level of PODXL transcripts in tumor cells is associated with poor prognosis in renal cancer.

References

Further reading